In men's college basketball, the Game of the Century was a historic National Collegiate Athletic Association (NCAA) game between the Houston Cougars and the UCLA Bruins played on January 20, 1968, at the Astrodome in Houston, Texas. It was the first NCAA regular season game broadcast nationwide in prime time. It established college basketball as a sports commodity on television and paved the way for the modern "March Madness" television coverage.

History
The UCLA Bruins were the dominant NCAA men's basketball program of the era, having won Division I championships in 1964, 1965, and 1967. Lew Alcindor of UCLA was a talented player who was credited with reviving interest in college basketball, with Bruin games selling out arenas. Houston Cougars coach Guy Lewis wanted to prove his program's worth to his critics, so he decided to schedule UCLA. Houston and UCLA had met in the previous season in the semifinals of the 1967 NCAA Tournament. UCLA had prevailed against Houston 73–58, and won their 3rd NCAA championship.

The game

Ted Nance, the sports information director for the University of Houston, put the schedule together. UCLA sports information director J. D. Morgan talked Bruin head coach John Wooden into the game by explaining how great it would be for college basketball.  Nance put advertisements in the Cougar football programs touting the game as the "Game of the Century."

The game was televised nationally via a syndication package through the TVS Television Network, with Dick Enberg announcing and Bob Pettit providing color commentary.   Morgan had insisted to TVS owner Eddie Einhorn that TVS use Enberg, the Bruins' play-by-play announcer.  Einhorn paid $27,000 for the broadcast rights on TVS. TVS signed up 120 stations, many of which would preempt regularly scheduled network programming. The basketball floor actually came from the Los Angeles Memorial Sports Arena.

The Bruins arrived in Houston with a 47-game, two-and-a-half-season winning streak. The Cougars were also undefeated since the last meeting between the two teams.

The first half between the AP Poll's No. 1 UCLA and No. 2 Houston closed with the Cougars up by three points.    The second half saw the tension between the squads highlighted within the matchup of Houston's Elvin Hayes and UCLA's Lew Alcindor (later known as Kareem Abdul Jabbar). Hayes, a 6-foot-9 forward, was not directly matched against the 7–2 Alcindor, but he did block three of Alcindor's shots, and the crowd roared his nickname, "Big E."

With two minutes remaining in the game, the score was tied at 69 after the Bruins' Lucius Allen made a pair of free throws. Hayes took a shot and was fouled by Bruins reserve Jim Nielsen.  Hayes, playing with four fouls in the second half, scored two free throws. The Bruins still had time to score, but an attempted basket by Allen would not drop. On the last possession, UCLA's All-American guard Mike Warren committed a rare mental error deflecting out of bounds a pass meant for UCLA's star shooter Lynn Shackelford, who was unguarded in the corner.

In the end, the Cougars pulled the upset, 71–69, ending the Bruins' 47-game winning streak.

Aftermath

Up to that point, only NCAA post-season games had been broadcast nationally, so there was much skepticism regarding where the broadcast would take the non-profit organization's policy.  The broadcast drew a vast television audience in addition to the 52,693 fans who had filled the Astrodome for its first basketball game. Each school received $125,000 for the game, four times the 1968 NCAA tournament payout of $31,781.

The January 1968 cover of Sports Illustrated depicted the game, with Hayes shooting over Alcindor. Alcindor—who had sustained an eye injury at a game against Cal a week earlier—had the worst performance of his college career. It was one of only two times in his UCLA career that he shot less than 50% from the field.

Three days after the game, UCLA starting forward Edgar Lacy quit the team. Wooden had benched him after 11 minutes, and he never re-entered the game. Upset with Wooden's public comments implying that he did not want back into the game, Lacy quit the team. "I've never enjoyed playing for that man," Lacy said of Wooden after quitting. In 2008, Wooden stated, "I'm sorry I said that. It hurt him, and that's why he quit. I was very disappointed. Edgar was a fine boy."

Neither Houston nor UCLA lost another game for the remainder of the regular season. The teams met again in the 1968 NCAA Tournament semifinals, with the then-No. 2 ranked Bruins winning 101–69 against the No. 1 Cougars.  Assistant coach Jerry Norman was credited by Wooden for devising the diamond-and-one defense that the Bruins used to contain Hayes, who was averaging 37.7 points per game but was held to only 10. UCLA advanced and defeated the North Carolina Tar Heels 78–55 for the 1968 title. Houston also lost the consolation game to Ohio State. Those games were at the Los Angeles Memorial Sports Arena, on the same floor used in the Astrodome game.

The 1971 NCAA Tournament was held at the Astrodome following the success of the game and drew more than 31,000 spectators for both the semifinals and championship. The 1982 tournament was held at the Louisiana Superdome. Eventually, most Final Fours were awarded only to host cities with domed stadiums. Starting with the 1997 tournament, only domed stadiums have hosted the Final Four.

UCLA and Houston played again in 1969 at Pauley Pavilion for the regular-season rematch. UCLA won 100–64. UCLA won six more national championships under Wooden. Lewis led his Phi Slama Jama teams to three consecutive Final Fours (1982–1984), advancing to the national championship game in 1983 and 1984.

In 2006, Hayes, Kareem Abdul-Jabbar (Lew Alcindor) and Wooden were inducted into the National Collegiate Basketball Hall of Fame, followed by Lewis in 2007.

Significance
Previously, only NCAA post-season games were broadcast on national television. The "Game of the Century" proved that a national audience would watch college basketball games during the regular season. Furthermore, it was telecast not by a Big Three Network but rather by the independent TVS Television Network.  In 1969, NBC became the first major network to broadcast the championship game, at a cost of more than $500,000. In 2008, the NCAA deal with CBS to televise the entire tournament was worth $545 million.

References

Bibliography

 
Sports Illustrated January 29, 1968
Jerry Wizig - UH Stuns Mighty UCLA 71-69. Houston Chronicle, January 21, 1968
Jeff Prugh - Big E Stands For End Of Bruin Streak. Los Angeles Times, January 21, 1968
J.R. Gonzales - The Game of the Century: Looking back 40 years
Al Carter - `GAME OF THE CENTURY'/A boon for college basketball, a bust for spectators. Houston Chronicle, January 20, 1988
Eddie Sefko - `GAME OF THE CENTURY'/Game now unimportant, says Hayes. Houston Chronicle, January 20, 1988

External links
Game of the Century retrospective blog (Alan Reifman)
Game of the Century retrospective (1982) from KPRC-TV Texas Archive of the Moving Image

UCLA Bruins men's basketball
Houston Cougars men's basketball
1967–68 NCAA University Division men's basketball season
College basketball games in the United States
1968 in sports in Texas
January 1968 sports events in the United States
TVS Television Network
Basketball in Houston
Nicknamed sporting events